Springville is an unincorporated community in Wayne County, in the U.S. state of Ohio. It lies southwest of Wooster, Ohio and north of Shreve, Ohio

History
Springville was platted in 1844. Early variant names were Buffalo and Heath's Corners. A post office called Springville was established in 1860, and remained in operation until 1902.

References

Unincorporated communities in Wayne County, Ohio
Unincorporated communities in Ohio